In mathematics, Puiseux series are a generalization of power series that allow for negative and fractional exponents of the indeterminate. For example, the series

is a Puiseux series in the indeterminate .  Puiseux series were first introduced by Isaac Newton in 1676 and rediscovered by Victor Puiseux in 1850.

The definition of a Puiseux series includes that the denominators of the exponents must be bounded. So, by reducing exponents to a common denominator , a Puiseux series becomes a Laurent series in a th root of the indeterminate.

Using modern terminology, Puiseux's theorem asserts that the set of Puiseux series over an algebraically closed field of characteristic 0 is itself an algebraically closed field, called the field of Puiseux series. It is the algebraic closure of the field of formal Laurent series, which itself is the field of fractions of the  ring of formal power series.

Definition 

In other words, Puiseux series differ from Laurent series in that they allow for fractional exponents of the indeterminate, as long as these fractional exponents have bounded denominator (here n). Just as with Laurent series, Puiseux series allow for negative exponents of the indeterminate as long as these negative exponents are bounded below (here by ). Addition and multiplication are as expected: for example,

and

The Puiseux series with coefficients in  form a field, which is the union

This yields an alternative definition of the field of Puiseux series in terms of a direct limit. For every positive integer , let  be an indeterminate (meant to represent ), and  be the field of formal Laurent series in  If  divides , the mapping  induces a field homomorphism  and these homomorphisms form a direct system that has the field of Puiseux series as a direct limit. The fact that every field homomorphism is injective shows that this direct limit can be identified with the above union, and that the two definitions are equivalent (up to an isomorphism).

Valuation 
A nonzero Puiseux series  can be uniquely written as

with  The valuation

The valuation of the zero series is 

The function  is a valuation and makes the Puiseux series a valued field, with the additive group  of the rational numbers as its valuation group.

As for every valued fields, the valuation defines a ultrametric distance by the formula  For this distance, the field of Puiseux series is a metric space. The notation

expresses that a Puiseux is the limit of its partial sums. However, the field of Puiseux series is not complete; see below .

Convergent Puiseux series 
Puiseux series provided by Newton–Puiseux theorem are convergent in the sense that there is a neighborhood of zero in which they are convergent (0 excluded if the valuation is negative).
More precisely, let

be a Puiseux series with complex coefficients. A Puiseux series is convergent if it has a nonzero radius of convergence.

The existence of the radius of convergence results from the similar existence for a power series, applied to  considered as a power series in 

It is a part of Newton–Puiseux theorem that the provided Puiseux series have a positive radius  of convergence, and thus define a (multivalued) analytic function in some neighborhood of zero (zero itself possibly excluded).

Valuation and order on coefficients 
Essentially, this means that any positive rational power of the indeterminate  is made positive, but smaller than any positive element in the base field .

Essentially, this means that the previously defined valuation  is corrected by an infinitesimal amount to take into account the valuation  given on the base field.

Newton–Puiseux theorem 
As early as 1671, Isaac Newton implicitly used Puiseux series and proved the following theorem for approximating with series the roots of algebraic equations whose coefficients are functions that are themselves approximated with series or polynomials. For this purpose, he introduced the Newton polygon, which remains a fundamental tool in this context. Newton worked with truncated series, and it is only in 1850 that Victor Puiseux introduced the concept of (non-truncated) Puiseux series and proved the theorem that is now known as Puiseux's theorem or Newton–Puiseux theorem. The theorem asserts that, given an algebraic equation whose coefficients are polynomials or, more generally, Puiseux series over a field of characteristic zero, every solution of the equation can be expressed as a Puiseux series. Moreover, the proof provides an algorithm for computing these Puiseux series, and, when working over the complex numbers, the resulting series are convergent.

In modern terminology, the theorem can be restated as: the field of Puiseux series over a field of characteristic zero, and the field of convergent Puiseux series over the complex numbers, are both algebraically closed.

Newton polygon

Let

This is the role of the Newton polygon.

That is, the edges of the Newton polygon are the line segments joigning two of these points, such that all these points are not below the line supporting the segment (below is, as usually, relative to the value of the second coordinate).

That is,  and  must belong to an edge of the Newton polygon, and

must be the opposite of the slope of this edge. This is a rational number as soon as all valuations  are rational numbers, and this is the reason for introducing rational exponents in Puiseux series.

In summary, the valuation of a root of  must be the opposite of a slope of an edge of the Newton polynomial.

The initial coefficient of a Puiseux series solution of  can easily be deduced.
where  is the set of the indices  such that  belongs to the edge of slope  of the Newton polygon. So, for having a root, the initial coefficient  must be a nonzero root of the polynomial

(this notation will be used in the next section).

In summary, the Newton polynomial allows an easy computation of all possible initial terms of Puiseux series that are solutions of 

The proof of Newton–Puiseux theorem will consist of starting from these initial terms for computing recursively the next terms of the Puiseux series solutions.

Constructive proof
Let suppose that the first term  of a Puiseux series solution of  has been be computed by the method of the preceding section.

One may apply to it the method of the Newton polygon, and iterate for getting the terms of the Puiseux series, one after the other. But some care is required for insuring that  and showing that one get a Puiseux series, that is, that the denominators of the exponents of  remain bounded.

and the equality occurs if and only if   where  is the polynomial of the preceding section.

This means that, for iterating the method of Newton polygon, one can and one must consider only the part of the Newton polygon whose first coordinates belongs to the interval  Two cases have to be considered separately and will be the subject of next subsections, the so-called ramified case, where , and the regular case where .

Regular case

Ramified case 
The way of applying recursively the method of the Newton polygon has been described precedingly. As each application of the method may increase, in the ramified case, the denominators of exponents (valuations), it remains to prove that one reaches the regular case after a finite number of iterations (otherwise the denominators of the exponents of the resulting series would not be bounded, and this series would not be a Puiseux series.

Without loss of generality, one can suppose that  that is,  Indeed, each factor  of  provides a solution that is the zero Puiseux series, and such factors can be factored out.

Indeed, the square-free factorization uses only the operations of the field of coefficients for factoring  into square-free factors than can be solved separately. (The hypothesis of characteristic zero is needed, since, in characteristic , the square-free decomposition can provide irreducible factors, such as  that have multiple roots over an algebraic extension.)

In this context, one defines the length of an edge of a Newton polygon as the difference of the abscissas of its end points. The length of a polygon is the sum of the lengths of its edges. The length of an edge of the Newton polygon is the number of roots of a given valuation. This number equals the degree of the previously defined polynomial 

The ramified case corresponds thus to two (or more) solutions that have the same initial term(s). As these solutions must be distinct (square-free hypothesis), they must be distinguished after a finite number of iterations. That is, one gets eventually a polynomial  that is square free, and the computation can continue as in the regular case for each root of 

As the iteration of the regular case does not increase the denominators of the exponents, This shows that the method provides all solutions as Puiseux series, that is, that the field of Puiseux series over the complex numbersis an algebraically closed field that contains the univariate polynomial ring with complex coefficients.

Failure in positive characteristic
The Newton–Puiseux theorem is not valid over fields of positive characteristic.  For example, the equation  has solutions

and

(one readily checks on the first few terms that the sum and product of these two series are 1 and  respectively; this is valid whenever the base field K has characteristic different from 2).

As the powers of 2 in the denominators of the coefficients of the previous example might lead one to believe, the statement of the theorem is not true in positive characteristic. The example of the Artin–Schreier equation  shows this: reasoning with valuations shows that X should have valuation , and if we rewrite it as  then

and one shows similarly that  should have valuation , and proceeding in that way one obtains the series

since this series makes no sense as a Puiseux series—because the exponents have unbounded denominators—the original equation has no solution.

(This implies the former theorem since any algebraically closed field of characteristic zero is the unique quadratic extension of some real-closed field.)

Puiseux expansion of algebraic curves and functions

Algebraic curves 
We also assume that  is not the coordinate axis .

This existence of a formal parametrization of the branches of an algebraic curve or function is also referred to as Puiseux's theorem: it has arguably the same mathematical content as the fact that the field of Puiseux series is algebraically closed and is a historically more accurate description of the original author's statement.

Analytic convergence 

Generalizations

Levi-Civita field 

The field of Puiseux series is not complete as a metric space. However, even this completion is still not "maximally complete" in the sense that it admits non-trivial extensions which are valued fields having the same value group and residue field, hence the opportunity of completing it even more.

Hahn series 

Hahn series are a further (larger) generalization of Puiseux series, introduced by Hans Hahn in the course of the proof of his embedding theorem in 1907 and then studied by him in his approach to Hilbert's seventeenth problem. In a Hahn series, instead of requiring the exponents to have bounded denominator they are required to form a well-ordered subset of the value group (usually  or ). These were later further generalized by Anatoly Maltsev and Bernhard Neumann to a non-commutative setting (they are therefore sometimes known as Hahn–Mal'cev–Neumann series). Using Hahn series, it is possible to give a description of the algebraic closure of the field of power series in positive characteristic which is somewhat analogous to the field of Puiseux series.

Notes

See also
 Laurent series
 Madhava series
 Newton's divided difference interpolation
 Padé approximant

References 
 
 
 
 
 
  (Translated from Latin)

External links 
 
 Puiseux series at MathWorld
 Puiseux's Theorem at MathWorld
 Puiseux series at PlanetMath

Commutative algebra
Algebraic curves
Mathematical series